Harvie Ferguson was Professor of Sociology at the University of Glasgow until his retirement in 2011. He  has written extensively on the development of cultural, philosophical, and psychological aspects of the development of western modernity.

He has published research on war experience in both a modern European and Japanese perspective. His most recent book in English is Self-Identity and Everyday Life (2009)

Selected works  
 Ferguson, H. (2010), La pasión agotada. Estilos de la vida contemporánea. Buenos Aires/Madrid, Katz editores, 
 Ferguson, H. (2006), Phenomenological Sociology. Insight and Experience in Modern Society. London, Sage. 
 Ferguson, H. (2000), Modernity and Subjectivity. Body, Soul, Spirit. Charlottesville, University of Virginia Press 
 Ferguson, H. (1996), The Lure of Dreams. Sigmund Freud and the Construction of Modernity. London, Routledge 
 Ferguson, H. (1994), Melancholy and the Critique of Modernity. Søren Kierkegaard's Religious Psychology. London, Routledge 
 Ferguson, H. (1992), Religious Transformation in Western Society. The End of Happiness. London, Routledge 
 Ferguson, H. (1990), The Science of Pleasure. Cosmos and Psyche in the Bourgeois World View. London, Routledge

Footnotes

References

External links
  Harvie Ferguson in University of Glasgow

British sociologists
Living people
Year of birth missing (living people)